Fibronectin type-III domain-containing protein 3a is a protein that in humans is encoded by the FNDC3A gene.

References

Further reading